Kathleen Norris Stark (born April 26, 1956), better known as Koo Stark, is an American photographer and actress, known for her relationship with Prince Andrew. She is a patron of the Julia Margaret Cameron Trust, which runs the museum of the Victorian pioneer photographer.

Early life and education
Stark was born in New York. Her parents were Wilbur Stark, a writer and producer, and Kathi Norris, a writer and television presenter in New York City. She is the youngest of three children, the others being Pamela and Brad. At the time of her birth, the family was living in the city's Manhattan borough. Her grandfather, Edwin Earl Norris, was a cabinetmaker and musician, playing the French horn and the viola in the Newark Symphony Orchestra. Her mother's family were Presbyterians.<ref>Andrew Devore Boyd, Joseph Boyd, Sr. (died 1799) of Prince George's County, Maryland, and his family through six generations' (2010), p. 34: '221. Lena A. Loyd'</ref> After a divorce in the 1960s, her mother remarried.

Koo Stark attended the Hewitt School in New York and the Glendower Preparatory School in Kensington, London. After training at a stage school, she began her acting career.Wilbur Stark, TV Producer, 81 , dated August 14, 1995, at nytimes.com, accessed 12 November 2017

Career

 Acting 
Her first film role was in the comedy All I Want Is You... and You... and You... (1974), produced by her father. In 1975 she appeared in Las adolescentes (The Adolescents), opposite Anthony Andrews, and starred in an episode of Shades of Greene.
Also that year she had an uncredited role as a bridesmaid in The Rocky Horror Picture Show. Her best-remembered performance is the lead role in the erotic film Emily (1976), directed by Henry Herbert, 17th Earl of Pembroke. Uncertain whether to accept the part, Stark did so on the advice of Graham Greene, with whom she had worked the year before. Of working with her in Emily, actor Victor Spinetti later wrote "I found Koo Stark to be an enchanting girl and terribly bright and interesting".

She also appeared in Cruel Passion (1977), a film based on the novel Justine. Around the same time, she played the part of Camie Marstrap in Star Wars (1977); the scenes in which she appeared were cut from the film before its original release, but can be seen in Star Wars: Behind the Magic (1998).

Stark also began to work as a fashion model, particularly for Norman Parkinson. In February 1981, she was at the National Theatre  as an understudy in the Edward Albee play Who's Afraid of Virginia Woolf?She appeared in the comedy Eat the Rich (1987), and then featured in "Timeslides", an episode of the sci-fi show Red Dwarf (1989), playing Lady Sabrina Mulholland-Jjones, the fiancée of a more successful Dave Lister. 

In September 1987, she returned to the stage, taking the part of Vera Claythorne in Agatha Christie's And Then There Were None at the Duke of York's Theatre. The London Theatre Record posed the question "Why has a girl so obviously three-dimensional chosen a part so obviously two-dimensional?" She played Miss Scarlett in the 1991 series of Cluedo, succeeding Toyah Willcox and befriending Rula Lenska.

Photography
Stark has worked as a photographer since the 1980s, and may have been the first person to turn the tables on the pursuing paparazzi by taking photos of them. Prince Andrew has told how in 1983 a photographic printer, Gene Nocon, invited Stark to take photographs of people taking photos of her, for his exhibition, Personal Points of View, planned for October. She persuaded Nocon to include Andrew's work as well. Her early photographs led to a book deal, for which she took lessons from Norman Parkinson. She travelled to Tobago, where he lived, and he became her mentor. Her book Contrasts (1985) included about a hundred of her photographs. She went on to study the work of leading photographers, including Angus McBean, whom she met and photographed, developing her interests in photography to include reportage, portraits, landscapes, still life, and other work.

The book Contrasts was launched at Hamiltons Gallery, London, in September 1985, at an exhibition of the same name. In 1994, the Gallery Bar at the Grosvenor House Hotel in Park Lane hosted an exhibition called 'The Stark Image', forty photographs by Stark, including several previously unpublished. In 1998, her work was featured at the Como Lario in Holbein Place, Belgravia. In July 2001 she had an exhibition called 'Stark Images" at the Fruitmarket Gallery in Edinburgh, duplicated from June to July 2001 at Dimbola Lodge on the Isle of Wight. A solo exhibition of portraits was at the Winter Gardens, Ventnor, from September to October 2010, and another at Dimbola Lodge from February to April, 2011.

On 22 April 1987, a charity auction at Christie's, St James's, for the Campaign to Protect Rural England, featured signed work by David Bailey, Patrick Lichfield, Don McCullin, Terence Donovan, Fay Godwin, Heather Angel, Clive Arrowsmith, Linda McCartney, Koo Stark, and fifteen others,BBC Wildlife, Volumes 4-5 (1986), p. 201 Views by Stark, including some of Kirby Muxloe Castle, were in G. H. Davies's England's Glory (1987), a CPRE book launched at the same time.

Pictures by Stark have appeared in Country Life and other magazines. Several of her portraits are in the National Portrait Gallery, and work is also in the collections of the Victoria and Albert Museum, both in London.

A Leica user, Stark has said her camera transcends mere function and is a personal friend. A solo exhibition hosted by the Leica gallery in Mayfair in May 2017 was entitled Kintsugi, a Japanese word for a way of renovating things that have been broken. Stark explained the title: "Kintsugi is a way of learning to see individual beauty, and to appreciate the value of experience and honesty. It is the antithesis of digital, airbrushed, Photoshop-homogenised 'beauty'." In August the exhibition was repeated in Manchester, to mark the opening of a new Leica store there.

Personal life
Stark has been a practising Buddhist since meeting the Dalai Lama. She continues to live in London and is a member of the Chelsea Arts Club. She is a Patron of the Julia Margaret Cameron Trust, at Dimbola Lodge on the Isle of Wight, home of the Victorian pioneer photographer Julia Margaret Cameron.

Relationships
Stark met Prince Andrew in February 1981, and they were close for some two years, before and after his active service in the Falklands War.Alastair Burnet, The ITN book of the royal wedding (Michael O'Mara Books, 1986), p. 38: "The actress Miss Koo Stark was a regular girlfriend of Prince Andrew for several years." Tina Brown has claimed that this was Andrew's only serious love affair. In October 1982 they took a holiday together on the island of Mustique. According to Lady Colin Campbell, Andrew was in love, and the Queen was "much taken with the elegant, intelligent, and discreet Koo". However, in 1983, after 18 months of dating, they split up under pressure from the Queen. In 1997, Prince Andrew became the godfather of Stark's daughter, and in 2015, when the Prince was accused by Virginia Roberts over the Jeffrey Epstein connection, Stark came to his defence, stating that he was a good man and she could help to rebut the claims.

Stark married Tim Jefferies, manager of a photographic gallery, in August 1984, at St Saviour's, Chalk Farm, with the minister, Christopher Neil-Smith, commenting that "It was such a quiet affair you wouldn't have known it was happening." They stayed together for a year, later divorcing.

She was later engaged to Warren Walker, an American banker, but he cancelled their wedding before the birth of their daughter, Tatiana, in May 1997.

Legal cases
In 1988, Stark brought a successful libel action against The Mail on Sunday over an untrue story headed 'Koo dated Andy after she wed'. In 1989, The Spectator reported that she had received £300,000 from one newspaper "for years of inaccurate persecution" and was also collecting money from others.

In another libel action in 2007, Stark won an apology and substantial damages from Zoo Weekly magazine, which had described her as a porn star. She commented "I am relieved that my name has been cleared of this false, highly damaging and serious allegation which has been proved to be completely untrue." In 2011 The Daily Telegraph called her an early "Kate Middleton prototype" and suggested that if she had not appeared in the film Emily early in her career she might have gone on to become the Duchess of York.

In November 2012, Stark appeared at Hammersmith magistrates court accused of stealing a painting by Dutch master Anthonie van Borssom, worth £40,000, from the home of her ex-partner, American financier Warren Walker.

In November 2022, Stark was awarded substantial damages and received an apology in a court case brought against Daily Mail''s parent company for a 2019 article which falsely referred to her as "a soft porn actress".

Health
About 1993, Stark was hit by a taxi in Old Compton Street, London, losing two teeth and also suffering a deep wound to her forehead, after a collision with her camera. This accident left her temporarily disfigured, but the wound eventually healed leaving a small scar just under the hair-line.

In 2002 Stark was diagnosed with breast cancer and underwent a double mastectomy and chemotherapy, causing her to lose her hair for a time.

Films and television

Film

Television

Publications

Photographic exhibitions
'Contrasts', Hamiltons Gallery, Carlos Place, London, September 1985
'The Stark Image', Gallery Bar at Grosvenor House Hotel, London, 1994
'Stark Images', Dimbola Lodge, Isle of Wight, June to July 2001
'Stark Images', Fruitmarket Gallery, Market Street, Edinburgh, July 2001
'Portraits by Koo Stark', Winter Gardens, Ventnor, Isle of Wight, September to October 2010
'Koo Stark: Contrasts', Dimbola Lodge, Isle of Wight, February to April, 2011
'Kintsugi', Leica gallery, Bruton Place, Mayfair, May 2017
'Kintsugi', Leica store, Police Street, Manchester, August 2017
'Kintsugi Portraits', San Lorenzo, Beauchamp Place, London SW3, November 2017

References

External links
Koo Stark Pictures and Images at gettyimages.co.uk
 
Koo Stark exhibition at Dimbola Lodge, Isle of Wight, Feb 2011, by Birgit Cunningham

1956 births
Living people
Actresses from New York City
American Buddhists
American emigrants to England
American female models
American film actresses
American women photographers
Hewitt School alumni
Fine art photographers
American portrait photographers